Richard Blair-Oliphant is a composer of music for film and television. He has been a composer on over 40 projects, including the series How the Universe Works and I Shouldn't Be Alive, as well as the televised broadcast of the 62nd Primetime Emmy Awards. His work on the Discovery Channel mini-series, When We Left Earth: The NASA Missions, was nominated for an Emmy award for Outstanding Individual Achievement in a Craft: Music and Sound at the 30th annual News & Documentary Emmy Awards. He is also composer of the music for 2012 movie The Dinosaur Project and the 2004 fantasy/science fiction film The Last Dragon (2004 film) as well as the BBC Election theme used from 2010 until 2017. And the music of the documentary Last day of Dinosaurs 2010.

External links
 Official Page of Richard Blair-Oliphant

References

Year of birth missing (living people)
Living people
American male composers
21st-century American composers
21st-century American male musicians